Jeppe Johannes Ladegaard-Mikkelsen (17 March 1915 – 8 October 1990) was a Danish equestrian. He competed in two events at the 1948 Summer Olympics.

References

External links
 

1915 births
1990 deaths
Danish male equestrians
Olympic equestrians of Denmark
Equestrians at the 1948 Summer Olympics
People from Fredericia
Sportspeople from the Region of Southern Denmark